Channing Chasten (born July 13, 2000) is an American soccer player who currently plays for Phoenix Rising in the USL Championship.

Career

Youth
Born in Cleveland, Ohio, Chasten moved to Queen Creek, Arizona when he was 10-years old. Here he played high school soccer at Hamilton High School as well as playing at club level with Arizona Arsenal until 2019. Chasten was a 2016 High School State championship, a two-time Arizona Youth Soccer Association State Champion, and was named First Team All Region and Top Drawer Preseason All- American.

College
In 2019, Chasten attended Ohio State University to play college soccer. Chasten made 40 appearances for the Buckeyes, scoring one goal and tallying five assists, been named an Academic All-Big Ten in both 2020 and 2021.

Professional
On January 11, 2022, it was announced that Chasten had left college a year early to sign with USL Championship club Phoenix Rising. He made his professional debut on March 12, 2022, appearing as an 85th–minute substitute during a 4–2 victory over Monterey Bay FC.

References

2000 births
Living people
American soccer players
Association football defenders
Association football forwards
Ohio State Buckeyes men's soccer players
People from Queen Creek, Arizona
Phoenix Rising FC players
Soccer players from Arizona
Soccer players from Ohio
Sportspeople from Cleveland
USL Championship players